The 1976 Cal Poly Mustangs football team represented California Polytechnic State University, San Luis Obispo as a member of the California Collegiate Athletic Association (CCAA) during the 1976 NCAA Division II football season. Led by ninth-year head coach Joe Harper, Cal Poly compiled an overall record of 7–1–1 with a mark of 2–0 in conference play, winning the CCAA title for the first of five consecutive seasons. The Mustangs played home games at Mustang Stadium in San Luis Obispo, California.

The CCAA lost two of its five members before the 1976 season. The UC Riverside Highlanders football program discontinued football after the 1975 season and the Cal State Los Angeles Diablos became an NCAA Division II independent. The CCAA continued with just the three teams until the conference stopped sponsoring football after the 1981 season.

Schedule

Team players in the NFL
No Cal Poly Mustang players were selected in the 1977 NFL Draft.

The following finished their college career in 1976, were not drafted, but played in the NFL.

References

Cal Poly
Cal Poly Mustangs football seasons
California Collegiate Athletic Association football champion seasons
Cal Poly Mustangs football